Pick Up the Pieces may refer to:

Albums 
 Pick Up the Pieces (album), a 1977 album by The Royals, or the title song
 Pick Up the Pieces EP, a 2008 EP by A Thorn for Every Heart, or the title song
 Pick Up the Pieces, a 1981 album by Eddie Kirkland, or a later short film about him

Songs 
 "Pick Up the Pieces" (Average White Band song), 1974
 "Pick Up the Pieces (To My Heart)" a 1989 song and EP single by Cindy Valentine
 "Pick Up the Pieces" (Jason Derulo song), 2011
 "Pick Up the Pieces", a song by Burning Spear from Studio One Presents Burning Spear
 "Pick Up the Pieces", a song by Carla Thomas
 "Pick Up the Pieces", a song by Hudson Ford
 "Pick Up the Pieces", a song by Bill Heid
 "Pick Up the Pieces", a song by Money Mark from Brand New by Tomorrow
 "Pick Up the Pieces", a song by Riddlin' Kids from Hurry Up and Wait
 "Pick Up the Pieces", a song by BoDeans from Outside Looking In (1987)

See also 
 Picking Up the Pieces (disambiguation)